The Baltic Ice Lake is a name given by geologists to a freshwater lake that evolved in the Baltic Sea basin as glaciers retreated from that region at the end of the last ice age. The lake existed between 12,600 and 10,300 years Before Present (BP).

The Baltic Ice Lake is one of a number of water stages that eventually resulted in the modern Baltic Sea. After the Baltic Ice Lake came the Yoldia Sea (10,300–9,500 BP), the Ancylus Lake (9,500–8,000 BP), the Mastogloia Sea (8,000–7,500 BP), the Littorina Sea (7,500–4,000 BP) and finally the Baltic Sea (4,000 BP–present day).

Phenomena related to ice lake and sea formation

The term lake is used to mean a body of primarily fresh water. A sea is filled with brackish or salt water. In the history of the Baltic Sea, the distinction is not always clear. Salinity has varied with location, depth and time.

The main factors are the advance or recession of the Scandinavian glacier and the isostatic sinking of the landforms due to the weight of ice or isostatic rebound (springing back) when relieved of it. The glacier provides a massive flow of fresh water. Salt water enters from the North Sea through straits when the sea level is high enough to allow reverse flow over the sill. When the straits are above sea level or close to sea level, fresh water will accumulate and a lake forms. Fresh water will accumulate to levels substantially higher than sea level when the sills are substantially above sea level. The release of fresh water from the glaciers depends on climate; the presence or absence of entrances to the ocean depends on land rise and oceanic water level; the latter of course is also affected by the amount of ice held in glaciers worldwide.

Several methods are used to determine the quality (temperature, salinity, solids content) of ancient sea water. The main one is the type of diatoms found in the sediment. Some species require salt water, while others require fresh. Other invertebrates serve as marker species as well. Also, periods of maximum supply from melt water are marked by low organic carbon in the sediment. Higher carbon content causes greater deposition of iron sulfide, which appears as a black varve.

Formation

The edge of the retreating Weichselian glacier departed from the Lake Gardno end-moraines of Pomerania (in present-day northern Poland) at around 14,000 BP and reached the southern shore of the Baltic Sea in the time window 13,500/13,000 BP. In the next several hundred years, closed fresh-water pools formed in the southern Baltic region from melt water as the ice retreated northward.

By 12,000 BP the edge of the glacier was at a line across southern Sweden to the northern shore of the Baltic countries.  A connected body of water, the Ramsay Sea, stretched from the Danish islands region to the shores of Estonia.
The Gulfs of Bothnia and Finland were still glaciated, as well as nearly all of Sweden north of Scania.  In the Allerød warm-period, rising land in the Denmark region created the Baltic Ice Lake.  It egressed through a small channel in the Strait of Øresund.  The lake was higher than sea level (which itself was lower than the present-day sea level) by some tens of metres.  Lake Ladoga formed part of the Baltic Ice Lake.

Emergence of the land then closed the channel through the Strait of Öresund. The lake rose until at about 11,200 BP it broke through a narrow corridor in the region of Mount Billingen in present-day south-west Sweden; Quaternary geologists used to describe the break-through as a massive, single tap of Niagara-like force, but it is now considered more likely that it happened in several steps over a limited period, perhaps a century, and along different local troughs and passages. By 10,800 BP the lake had dropped . At that point the climate reverted into cooling, and during a cold-climate period the glacier advanced again over the central Swedish exit. By this time the Gulf of Finland had been deglaciated.

The Danish Islands were all connected west of the Strait of Oresund. Around 10,500 BP the climate became warmer, the ice retreated to the north of Mount Billingen, and the waters broke through central Sweden again, providing a second egress. Water level dropped  to the sea level of that time.

Summary
At about 16,000 BP the retreating ice had reached the southern shores of the present Baltic.  Melt water formed extensive lacustrine systems still visible today in north Russia, Poland and Germany.  By 14,600 BP the Baltic Ice Lake had come into existence.  Beyond it only southern Sweden was habitable, and it was an island.  'Scandinavia' means "the island of Scandza" or "Scandia", which cannot be accounted for by today's map, and is generally assumed to be an inadvertent misrepresentation by ancient geographers. However, the first Scandinavia was an island, and was identical to southern Sweden.

Several carbon-dated sites in Estonia indicate that human habitation of the shores of the Baltic Ice Lake began in the Boreal period, in the time window 11,200-10,200 BP.  Charcoal, animal bones, and artefacts from Mesolithic temporary settlements have been found at Pulli and in the Lake Ladoga region.  The diet included roe deer, red deer, marten, otter, wolf, bear and ringed seal.  An open pine-birch forest covered the region.  Pollen from Pinus, Betula, Alnus, Rosaceae, Cyperaceae and Artemisia have been found.

Around 10,300 BP, the ice lake discharged through channels that opened in central Sweden (near Mount Billingen) until it reached the ocean level.  The Yoldia Sea phase began (10,300-9,500 BP).

References

External links
Polish Geological Institute, The Baltic Ice Lake
FENNIA 2002 180:1-2 Late Weichselian and Holocene shore displacement history of the Baltic Sea in Finland

Baltic Sea
Former lakes of Europe
Proglacial lakes
11th millennium BC